Peter Mikuš (born January 10, 1985) is a Slovak professional ice hockey defenceman currently playing for MHK Dubnica nad Váhom of the Slovak 1. Liga.

He played with BK Mladá Boleslav in the Czech Extraliga during the 2010–11 Czech Extraliga season.

Mikuš previously played for HK Dukla Trenčín, HC Košice and HC České Budějovice.

Career statistics

Regular season and playoffs

References

External links

1985 births
Living people
HC '05 Banská Bystrica players
HK Dukla Trenčín players
HC Košice players
BK Mladá Boleslav players
Motor České Budějovice players
HC Neftekhimik Nizhnekamsk players
HC Nové Zámky players
ŠHK 37 Piešťany players
Slovak ice hockey defencemen
Stadion Hradec Králové players
Sportspeople from Trenčín
VHK Vsetín players
MsHK Žilina players
Slovak expatriate ice hockey players in Russia
Slovak expatriate ice hockey players in the Czech Republic